The women's 48 kilograms event at the 2002 Asian Games took place on September 30, 2002 at Pukyong National University Gymnasium, South Korea.

Schedule
All times are Korea Standard Time (UTC+09:00)

Records

Results 
Legend
NM — No mark

New records
The following records were established during the competition.

References
2002 Asian Games Official Report, Page 758
 Weightlifting Database
 Women's results

Weightlifting at the 2002 Asian Games